Christopher J. Einolf is a sociologist whose research interests include altruism, charitable giving, and volunteering, as well as torture and human rights. He is a professor of sociology at Northern Illinois University.

Works

References

Living people
American sociologists
Northern Illinois University faculty
Year of birth missing (living people)